Denis Donoghue may refer to:
Denis Donoghue (academic) (1928–2021), Irish literary critic
Denis Donoghue (rugby league) (1926–1993), Australian rugby league footballer